The Taiwan Beer Basketball Team is a semi-professional basketball team in the Super Basketball League (SBL) in Taiwan sponsored by the Taiwan Tobacco and Liquor Corporation (TTL).  Before the privatization of the sponsoring corporation in 1999, the team was named "Taiwan Tobacco and Wine Monopoly Bureau Golden Dragons" (公賣金龍) and was among the most successful franchises in Taiwan's amateur Division A conference (甲組聯賽). Since the inauguration of the SBL in 2003, the team has turned into a semi-professional club and won back-to-back championships between 2006 and 2008 bearing the new name of "Taiwan Beer".

Current roster

Notable players

Head coaches

SBL regular season records
 2003–2004 season: 6th place
 2004–2005 season: 4th place
 2005–2006 season: 2nd place
 2006–2007 season: 3rd place
 2007–2008 season: 2nd place
 2008–2009 season: 3rd place
 2009–2010 season: 4th place
 2010–2011 season: 1st place
 2011–2012 season: 2nd place
 2012–2013 season: 7th place
 2013–2014 season: 3rd place
 2014–2015 season: 3rd place
 2015–2016 season: 2nd place
 2016–2017 season: 3rd place
 2017–2018 season: 6th place
 2018–2019 season: 2nd place
 2019–2020 season: 1st place
 2020–2021 season: 1st place
 2021–2022 season: 2nd place

Championships
2006–2007
 Champions: Taiwan Beer
 Runners-up: Dacin Tigers
2007–2008
 Champions: Taiwan Beer
 Runners-up: Yulon Dinos
2010–2011
 Champions: Taiwan Beer
 Runners-up: Dacin Tigers
2015–2016
 Champions: Taiwan Beer
 Runners-up: Pure-Youth Construction Basketball Team
2019–2020
 Champions: Taiwan Beer
 Runners-up: Yulon Luxgen Dinos

2020–2021
 Champions: Taiwan Beer & Yulon Dinos

See also
 Azio Eagles
 Super Basketball League

External links
 Official website

 
Super Basketball League teams
Basketball teams established in 1968
1968 establishments in Taiwan